The men's mass start in the 2012–13 ISU Speed Skating World Cup was contested over four races on four occasions, out of a total of nine World Cup occasions for the season, with the first occasion taking place in Heerenveen, Netherlands, on 16–18 November 2012, and the final occasion also taking place in Heerenveen on 8–10 March 2013.

Arjan Stroetinga of the Netherlands won the cup, while Bart Swings of Belgium came second, and Jordan Belchos of Canada came third. The defending champion, Alexis Contin of France, ended up in 9th place.

Top three

Race medallists

Standings 
''Standings as of 10 March 2013 (end of the season).

References 

Men mass start